The discography of Tito El Bambino, a Puerto Rican singer, consists of seven studio albums, and One Greatest Hits album on EMI Televisa and Universal Music Latino/Siente Music. Collaborations are also included.

Tito El Bambino was with Héctor el Father and formed a duo called Héctor & Tito. They released six albums before parting ways.

After leaving Héctor el Father, Tito El Bambino released his first studio album, Top of the Line in 2006, which produced the hit singles "Caile", "Flow Natural", and "Mia" with Daddy Yankee. The same year, he released a Special Edition, "Top of the Line: El Internacional." It features 5 bonus new songs that were not included in the original version: "Siente El Boom (Remix)", "Enamorado", "Calentándote", "Bailarlo" and "Voy a Mí". The first single of the album is "Siente El Boom (Remix)" that is a big hit in Argentina. "Siente El Boom" is also on Chosen Few II: El Documental featuring Randy.
 
In 2007, he released his second commercial album It's My Time, which went just as big as Top of the Line. Artists featured on the album include R.K.M & Ken-Y, Pharrell, Toby Love, Jadiel, and Arcángel.

In 2009, Tito El Bambino's third solo album, El Patrón was released. The included includes his fellow reggaeton artists Zion & Lennox, and Plan B. Some chart toppers of this album include "El Amor" and "Under".

Albums

Studio albums

Reissue albums

EPs

Compilation albums

Singles 

Other charted songs

Collaborations

Album appearances

Music videos

See also 
 Héctor & Tito discography

References 

Discographies of Puerto Rican artists
Reggaeton discographies